Central Grove may refer to:

Central Grove, Mississippi
Central Grove, Nova Scotia